Rawleigh Warner Jr. (February 13, 1921June 26, 2013) was an American business executive, who was president of Mobil from 1965 to 1969 and chairman and chief executive officer from 1969 to 1986. He was recipient of the 1984 Henry Laurence Gantt Medal.

Early life
Rawleigh Warner Jr. was born February 13, 1921, in Chicago, Illinois, to Rawleigh Warner and Dorothy Haskins Warner.  He grew up in the northern parts of Chicago (Evanston and Winnetka).  

He attended Lake Forest Academy and graduated from the Lawrenceville School. He graduated with a Bachelor of Arts in economics from Princeton University in 1943; completing his senior thesis titled "Labor Problems in the Petroleum Industry: With Special Reference to the Pure Oil Company".

Career

Military service
He served in the United States Army during World War II as a Field Artillery officer with the 10th Mountain Division in Italy.  During his military service he was awarded the Silver Star, the Bronze Star Medal, and the Purple Heart.  He left the army as a captain in 1946.

Oil business
After a brief stint in finance, Warner was looking for a new career in 1948.  As his father Rawleigh Warner Sr. was chairman of Pure Oil, the oil business seemed like a natural fit.  Wishing to avoid the appearance of nepotism, Warner followed his father's advice and joined the financial staff of Continental Oil Company in Houston, Texas.  Warner served as the assistant to the treasurer and remained with Continental until 1953.

In 1953, Warner was recruited to join Socony-Vacuum Oil Company as the assistant to the vice president of finance in one of the company's divisions based in Fort Lee, New Jersey.  He later transferred to the parent company as its economics department manager.  Later he managed Socony’s Middle East department and was elected regional vice president of Mobil International Oil Company, one of Socony's divisions, in 1964.  After only twelve years working for Socony, Warner was elected president of the renamed Socony Mobil Oil Company on January 1, 1965, replacing Herbert Willetts.  In his second year as president, the company again changed its name to Mobil and modernized its logo from a red Pegasus to the word "Mobil" in blue letters with a red letter "O". On September 1, 1969, Warner was elected Chairman and CEO of Mobil, replacing Albert Nickerson.

He is attributed as leading Mobil's corporate sponsorship. Warner helped start Mobil's sponsorship of PBS's Masterpiece Theatre, a relationship that spanned from the 1970s to 2004. He is also noted for working with his Vice President of Public Affairs Herbert Schmertz to publish weekly paid Op-Eds under Mobil's name in national newspapers in the 1970's and 1980's, including the New York Times. He retired on February 1, 1986.

Other efforts
Warner was heavily involved with Princeton University, including serving as a trustee of Princeton University from 1968 to 1972 and being a member of the Resources Committee from 1981 to 1996. He was also a trustee of Barnard College, Lawrenceville School, and the Woodrow Wilson International Center for Scholars. He was one of the original trustees of the Kennedy Center.

He was chairman of the American Petroleum Institute. He was appointed by President Reagan to the newly formed President's Committee on the Arts and Humanities in 1982.

Personal life
Warner married Mary Ann deClairmont in 1946 and together they had two daughters, Alison and Suzanne.

He was a devoted golf player.

Later life
Warner died in Hobe Sound, Florida on June 26, 2013 from complications of inclusion body myositis.

Awards and honors
Warner received the following awards and honors throughout his life:
 Henry Laurence Gantt Medal, American Society of Mechanical Engineers, March 1984
 Honorary degree from Princeton University, 1984
 Honorary degree from Marietta College
 Honorary degree from Pace University
 Gold Medal Award, American Petroleum Institute

References

External links 
 Rawleigh Warner, image-conscious Mobil Oil executive, dies at 92, The Washington Post obituary, 2013

1921 births
2013 deaths
American businesspeople
ExxonMobil people
Lake Forest Academy alumni
Lawrenceville School alumni
Princeton University alumni
United States Army personnel of World War II
Recipients of the Silver Star
Henry Laurence Gantt Medal recipients
United States Army officers